Walterella is a monotypic moth genus of the family Noctuidae erected by Harrison Gray Dyar Jr. in 1921. Its only species, Walterella ocellata, was first described by William Barnes and James Halliday McDunnough in 1910. It is found in the US state of Arizona.

References

Hadeninae
Monotypic moth genera